The 1962 United States Senate special election in New Hampshire took place on November 6, 1962, to elect a U.S. Senator to complete the unexpired term of Senator Styles Bridges, who died on November 26, 1961. New Hampshire Attorney General Maurice J. Murphy Jr. was appointed on December 7, 1961 by Governor Wesley Powell to fill the vacancy until a special election could be held.

Murphy was defeated in the Republican primary by Congressman Perkins Bass, who went on to be defeated in the general election by Democratic nominee Thomas J. McIntyre.

Primary elections
Primary elections were held on September 11, 1962.

Democratic primary

Candidates
Thomas J. McIntyre, Democratic nominee for New Hampshire's 1st congressional district in 1954

Results

Republican primary

Candidates
Perkins Bass, incumbent U.S. Representative
Doloris Bridges, widow of Styles Bridges
Chester Earl Merrow, incumbent U.S. Representative
Maurice J. Murphy Jr., incumbent United States Senator

Results

General election

Results

See also 
 1962 United States Senate elections

References

Bibliography
 
 
 

1962
New Hampshire
United States Senate
New Hampshire 1962
New Hampshire 1962
United States Senate 1962